José Luis Castillo (born December 14, 1973) is a Mexican former professional boxer who competed from 1990 to 2014. Generally considered one of the best lightweights of his era, he is a two-time world champion at that weight, having held the WBC title twice, from 2000 to 2002 and 2004 to 2005; and the Ring magazine and lineal titles from 2004 to 2005. Castillo is best known for his 2005 fight against Diego Corrales, for which he received Fight of the Year awards by both The Ring and the Boxing Writers Association of America, as well as his first fight with Floyd Mayweather Jr., which ended with controversial scorecards.

Professional career

Lightweight

Castillo vs. Johnston I & II
In 2000, having two straight wins over Jorge Paez and Steve Quinonez, Castillo challenged WBC lightweight titleholder and Ring No. 1 ranked Lightweight Stevie Johnston. Heavily favored as underdog, Castillo was slated to lose. Instead, Castillo scored the Ring Magazine Upset of the Year, defeating Johnston by a majority decision, in what was a very close fight. Three months later, they fought to a draw, memorable because miscalculation adding the scores led to an original announcement of Johnston regaining his title, which Castillo learned about when Johnston showed up in his dressing room to return the strap.

After fighting Johnston, Castillo defended his title against Ring Top 10 Lightweight, César Bazán. Castillo defeated Bazan by 6th-round TKO, dropping Bazan in the 5th and 6th rounds.

Castillo vs. Mayweather I
In his first bout with undefeated American junior lightweight champion Floyd Mayweather Jr., Castillo started slow but gradually lured the flashy boxer into a toe to toe battle. Castillo had great success in the middle rounds, when he cut off the ring and used his strength to try wearing down Mayweather. As the fight progressed, Castillo's power and pressure seemed to turn the fight in his favor, having tremendous success with body punching while Mayweather became more stationary, allowing the stronger Castillo to do significant work. Castillo closed the fight strong, outlanding Mayweather 35-20 in the 11th round and totally dominated the 12th. Punch stats showed Castillo with lopsided totals in every category; punches landed, thrown & power punches landed & thrown and overall connect percentages. Despite the clear advantages numerically, judges Jerry Roth and John Keane scored it 115-111, and judge Anek Hongtongkam scored it 116-111, all for Mayweather, a decision that was loudly booed by the crowd. The HBO announce team loudly voiced its disapproval of the verdict, with unofficial scorer Harold Lederman having Castillo winning 115-111. The fight was controversial enough to the Mayweather team that a rematch was signed.

Castillo vs. Mayweather II
After Mayweather's successful shoulder surgery, Castillo re-matched with Mayweather. Mayweather used his quick footwork, combinations and his jab specialty to coast to another unanimous decision victory, this time with all analysts in agreement, including Harold Lederman. The smaller Mayweather was again outweighed by Castillo on the night of the fight, as Castillo weighed 147 and Mayweather weighed 138.

Castillo vs. Lazcano
On June 5, 2004, Castillo regained the Lightweight title and won the vacant Ring Lightweight title by defeating Ring No. 1 ranked Lightweight, Juan Lazcano. Castillo won the fight by unanimous decision, by the scores of 117-111, 116-112, and 115-113.

Castillo vs. Casamayor
In Castillo's first title defense, he fought former Super Featherweight and future Lightweight champion, Joel Casamayor.  In what was a very close fight, Castillo was awarded the close and controversial split decision. The scores were 116-112 and 117-111 for Castillo, and 115-113 for Casamayor. Castillo's next fight was a title defense against Ring Top 10 Lightweight, Julio Díaz, which Castillo won by TKO in the 10th round.

Castillo vs. Corrales I
On May 7, 2005, Castillo fought WBO Lightweight champion and Ring No. 1 ranked Lightweight, Diego Corrales. Corrales defeated José Luis Castillo for the WBC lightweight title via TKO in the tenth round. The fight is almost universally regarded as the best fight of 2005. Both men stood in front of each other, battering each other with hard combinations and power punches throughout the entire fight. Finally, in the tenth round, Castillo knocked Corrales down. Seconds later, Castillo knocked Corrales down again. Once on the ground, Corrales managed to beat the count, and, after a point was taken away for excessive spitting out of the mouthpiece, Corrales connected with a punch that Castillo later called "a perfect right hand." Corrales then trapped Castillo against the ropes and landed numerous punches, causing the referee, Tony Weeks, to stop the fight.

Castillo vs. Corrales II
A rematch between Corrales and Castillo occurred on October 8, 2005. On the day before the fight, Castillo weighed-in 3½ lb over the  lightweight limit. Since Castillo did not make the weight, the fight became a non-title bout. The two fighters continued with the same fighting style that they had used in the first fight, trading inside punches throughout the first three rounds. Early in the fourth round, Castillo knocked down Corrales with a left hook to his chin. Corrales wobbled to his feet at the referee's count of ten, causing the fight to end.

Corrales vs. Castillo III, dubbed "The War to Settle the Score," had been scheduled for February 4, 2006, but it was postponed because of a rib injury that Corrales suffered while training. The fight was rescheduled for June 3, 2006. At the weigh-in, however, Corrales weighed the  lightweight limit whereas Castillo weighed 139½ lb—causing the fight to be cancelled. Corrales later sued Castillo for punitive damages.

Light welterweight
On January 20, 2007, Castillo won a narrow split decision over Herman Ngoudjo. On June 23, he fought Ricky Hatton in Las Vegas. Castillo was KO'd 2 minutes and 16 seconds into the fourth round by a crunching left hook to the ribs, one of the few times a top ranked boxer of Castillo's caliber has been KO'ed by a bodyshot and reminiscent of the bout between Roy Jones Jr. and Virgil Hill. Prior to the knockout Castillo had been deducted a point for low blows to his opponent.
 
Castillo was scheduled to fight Timothy Bradley in 2008 for the right to be number 1 contender to the WBC Super lightweight title, but during the weigh-in on March 8, 2008, Castillo weighed 147½ pounds (7 pounds over the super-lightweight limit).  Bradley instead faced and defeated Junior Witter for the title.

Welterweight
On the Pacquiao vs Clottey undercard on March 14, 2010, Alfonso Gomez and Castillo clashed for Gomez' WBC Continental Americas welterweight title. Ringside reporters have said that the fight was to see if Castillo had it anymore, and for this type of fight such a minor title is nearly an insult. Castillo lost in round 5 by TKO (not answering to the bell). After the bout Castillo announced his retirement, stating, "I just found out tonight I don't have it anymore, I want to apologize to the public and I am definitely announcing my retirement."

After announcing his retirement in March 2010, Castillo returned to action in a fight against Roberto Valenzuela on June 18, 2010 and won the bout by unanimous decision. The match was held at the Auditorio Municipal in Tijuana, Baja California, Mexico

Professional boxing record

See also
List of WBC world champions
List of Mexican boxing world champions

References

External links

Jose Luis Castillo profile at About.com

1973 births
Lightweight boxers
Living people
People from Empalme, Sonora
Boxers from Sonora
World lightweight boxing champions
Mexican male boxers
World Boxing Council champions
The Ring (magazine) champions
Light-welterweight boxers
Welterweight boxers